Hindu College may refers to several colleges around the world, including:

India
Dharmamurthi Rao Bhahadur Calavala Cunnan Chetty's Hindu College, Chennai, Tamil Nadu
Gobardanga Hindu College, West Bengal
Gokul Das Hindu Girls College, Moradabad, Uttar Pradesh
Hindu College, Delhi, founded in 1899
Hindu College, Amritsar, Punjab
Hindu College, Guntur, Andhra Pradesh 
Hindu College, Machilipatnam, Andhra Pradesh 
Hindu College of Education, Sonipat, Haryana
Hindu College of Engineering Sonipat, Haryana 
Hindu College of Pharmacy, Sonipat, Haryana
Hindu Degree College, Moradabad, Uttar Pradesh
Presidency University, Kolkata and Hindu School, Kolkata, West Bengal, which was called Hindu College until 1855.
Sri Venkateswara Hindu College of Engineering, Machilipatnam, Andhra Pradesh
South Travancore Hindu College, Kanyakumari, Tamil Nadu

Sri Lanka
Attiar Hindu College
Batticaloa Hindu College
Chavakachcheri Hindu College
Colombo Hindu College
Jaffna Hindu College
Jaffna Hindu Ladies' College
Kilinochchi Hindu College
Kokuvil Hindu College
Manipay Hindu College
Manipay Ladies' Hindu College
Puttalam Hindu Central College
Sandilipay Hindu College
Sithivinayagar Hindu College, Mannar
Sri Shanmuga Hindu Ladies College
Trincomalee Hindu College
Vadamarachchi Hindu Girls' College
Vaddukoddai Hindu College
Valaichchenai Hindu College or Valaichenai Hindu College
Vavuniya Hindu College
Wijayaratnam Hindu Central College

Guyana
Hindu College, Cove and John

Hindu universities and colleges